This is a list of buildings that are examples of the Art Deco architectural style in Oklahoma, United States.

Ardmore 
 Ardmore Municipal Auditorium, Ardmore, 1943
 Hardy Murphy Coliseum, Ardmore, 1943
 Tivoli Theatre, Ardmore, 1915 and 1935
 YWCA, Ardmore, 1938

Clinton 
 Clinton Armory, Clinton, 1937
 Fire Station, Clinton, 1930s
 McLain Rogers Park, Clinton, 1934

Enid 
 102 Independence, Enid, 1938
 113 North. Grand, Enid, 1940
 115 North Grand, Enid, 1940
 323 Broadway, Enid, 1938
 Arcadia Theatre, 226 West Randolph Avenue, Enid, 1931
 Broadway Tower, Enid, 1931
 Cherokee Theatre (now retail), Enid, 1928
 Enid Armory, Enid, 1936
 Eugene S. Briggs Auditorium, Enid, 1957
 Garfield County Courthouse, Enid, 1896 and 1930
 Taft Elementary School, Enid, 1937
 Triangle Business Center (former Bass Building), Enid, 1930
 Woolworth's, Enid, 1910 and 1921

McAlester 
 110–114 East Choctaw (former Woolworth's), McAlester
 International Temple, Supreme Assembly, Order of the Rainbow for Girls, McAlester, 1951
 McAlester Armory, McAlester, 1936
 McAlester Scottish Rite Temple, McAlester, 1907 and1930
 OKLA Theater, McAlester, 1931 and 1948

Muskogee 
 304 East Callahan, Muskogee, 1925
 540 West Court (former Chrysler–DeSoto Dealership), Muskogee, 1948
 Fire Station No. 3, Muskogee, 1940s
 Fire Station No. 4, Muskogee, 1940s
 Roxy Theatre, Muskogee, 1948

Norman 
 301–302 South Porter, Norman, 1930
 747 Asp (former cleaner's), Norman, 1930
 Boomer Theater, Norman, 1947
 Cleveland County Courthouse, Norman, 1940
 Corner Thomas Garage (now A-1 Automotive), Norman, 1940s
 Hiland Dairy, Norman, 1940s
 Logan Apartments, Norman
 University Theatre, Norman, 1930
 Varsity Theatre (now retail), Norman

Oklahoma City 
 100 Park Avenue Building, Oklahoma City, 1923
 Agnew Theater, Oklahoma City, 1947
 Borden's Dairy Building, Oklahoma City, 1947
 Cain's Coffee Building, Oklahoma City, 1919
 Century Building, Oklahoma City
 Cheever's Flowers (now Cheever's Cafe), Oklahoma City, 1935
 City Place Tower, Oklahoma City, 1931
 Civic Center Music Hall, Oklahoma City, 1937
 Doctors Building, Oklahoma City, 1948
 Edmond Armory, Edmond, 1937
 First National Center, Oklahoma City, 1931
 Jewel Theater, Oklahoma City, 1931
 Lawyers Title Building, Oklahoma City, 1930
 Lyric at the Plaza Theater, Oklahoma City, 1935
 May Theatre, Oklahoma City, 1946
 Norton–Johnson Buick Company, Oklahoma City, 1930
 Nuway Laundry & Cleaners, Oklahoma City, 1940s
 Oklahoma County Courthouse, Oklahoma City, 1937
 Oklahoma Opry, Oklahoma City, 1946
 Raylyn Taylor Salon, Oklahoma City
 Santa Fe Depot, Oklahoma City, 1934
 Sewage Treatment Plant, Oklahoma City
 Taft Middle School, Oklahoma City, 1931
 United States Post Office, Courthouse, and Federal Office Building, Oklahoma City, 1912
 Will Rogers Theater Events Center, Oklahoma City, 1946

Shawnee 
 Auditorium, Shawnee
 Hornbeck Theatre, Shawnee, 1947
 Pottawatomie County Courthouse, Shawnee, 1934

Tulsa 
 11th Street Bridge, Tulsa, 1916
 Adah Robinson Residence, Tulsa, 1929
 Art Deco Lofts and Apartments, Tulsa, 1929
 Boston Avenue Methodist Church,Tulsa, 1929
 Boulder on the Park, Tulsa, 1923
 Brady Theater, Tulsa, 1910
 Central High School, Tulsa, 1925
 Christ the King Church, Tulsa, 1928
 Cities Service Station #8, Tulsa, 1940
 City Veterinary Hospital, Tulsa, 1942
 Continental Supply Company Building, Tulsa, 1921
 Day Building (now Nelson's Buffeteria), Tulsa, 1926
 Eleventh Street Arkansas River Bridge, Tulsa, 1929
 Expo Square Pavilion, Tulsa, 1932
 Fawcett Building, Tulsa, 1926
 Fire Station No. 13, Tulsa, 1931
 Fleeger Residence, Tulsa, 1937
 Guaranty Laundry, Tulsa, 1928
 Hawks Ice Cream, Tulsa, 1948
 Jesse D. Davis Residence, Tulsa, 1936
 John Duncan Forsyth Residence, Tulsa, 1937
 KVOO-TV Broadcast Facility, Tulsa, 1954
 Marquette School, Tulsa, 1932
 Mayo Motor Inn, Tulsa, 1950
 McGay Residence, Tulsa, 1936
 Merchant's Exhibit Building, Tulsa State Fairgrounds, Tulsa, 1930
 Metropolitan Tulsa Transit Authority Transfer Center, Tulsa, 1999
 Midwest Equitable Meter, Tulsa, 1929
 Midwest Marble and Tile Building, Tulsa, 1945
 Milady's Cleaners, Tulsa, 1930
 National Guard Armory, Tulsa, 1942
 National Supply Company (now U-Haul), Tulsa, 1930
 Oak Lawn Cemetery Entrance Gates, Tulsa, 1930
 Oklahoma Department of Transportation, Tulsa, 1940
 Oklahoma Natural Gas Company Building, Tulsa, 1925
 Page Warehouse, Tulsa, 1927
 Petroleum Building, Tulsa, 1921
 Philcade Building, Tulsa, 1931
 Philtower Building, Tulsa, 1928
 Phoenix Cleaners, Tulsa, 1937
 Pythian Building, Tulsa, 1931
 Riverside Studios, Tulsa, 1929
 Service Pipeline Building (former ARCO Building), Tulsa, 1949
 Sherman Residence, Tulsa, 1930s
 Southwestern Bell Main Dial Building, Tulsa, 1924
 Tulsa Club Building, Tulsa, 1927
 Tulsa Fire Alarm Building, Tulsa, 1934
 Tulsa Monument Company, Tulsa, 1936
 Tulsa SPCA, Tulsa, 1931
 Tulsa State Fairgrounds Pavilion, Tulsa, 1932
 Tulsa Union Depot, Tulsa, 1931
 Ungerman Residence, Tulsa, 1941
 Warehouse Market, Tulsa, 1930
 Webster High School, Tulsa, 1938
 Westhope, Tulsa, 1929
 Whentoff Residence, Tulsa, 1935
 Will Rogers High School, Tulsa, 1939

Other cities 
 Adair County Courthouse, Stilwell, 1930
 Allred Theatre, Pryor Creek, 1914 and 1942
 Anadarko Armory, Anadarko, 1937
 Armory, Cherokee
 Atoka Armory, Atoka, 1936
 Attucks School, Vinita, 1917
 Avant's Cities Service Station, El Reno, 1933
 Beard Motor Company, Bristol, 1947 and 1953
 Bristow Firestone Service Station, Bristow, 1929
 Campus Theatre, Stillwater, 1939
 Canute Service Station, Canute, 1939
 Central Fire Station, Ada
 City Hall, Vinita
 Claremore Auto Dealership, Claremore, 1930
 Clayton High School Auditorium, Clayton, 1936
 Bartlesville High School, Bartlesville, 1939
 Grady County Courthouse, Chickasha, 1935
 Gymnasium, Hennessey, 1941
 Gymnasium, Pernell, 1941
 Haskell County Courthouse, Stigler, 1931
 Healdtown Armory, Healdtown, 1936
 Holdenville Armory, Holdenville, 1936
 Hominy Armory, Hominy, 1937
 Hugo Armory, Hugo, 1936
 Jefferson County Courthouse, Waurika, 1931
 Kerr-Mac Service Station, Pauls Valley
 Leachman Theatre (now a furniture showroom), Stillwater, 1948
 Long Theatre, Keyes, 1947
 Masonic Temple, Anadarko
 Memorial Park Swimming Pool, Blackwell, 1940s
 Minco Armory, Minco, 1936
 Municipal Building, Fairview
 Okmulgee Armory, Okmulgee, 1937
 Page Memorial Library, Sand Springs, 1930
 Pawnee County Courthouse, Pawnee, 1932
 Pensacola Dam, between Disney and Langley, 1940
 Poncan Theatre, Ponca City, 1927
 Rialto Theatre, Alva, 1949
 Roff Armory, Roff, 1937
 Sallisaw High School, Sallisaw, 1939
 Sayre Champlin Service Station, Sayre, 1934
 Softener & Filter Unit, El Reno, 1930s or 1940s
 Southwestern Bell Telephone Building, Stroud, 1929
 Sulphur Armory, Sulphur, 1937
 Tahlequah Armory, Tahlequah, 1937
 Telephone Building, Waynoka
 United States Post Office Coalgate, Coalgate, 1940
 United States Post Office Hollis, Hollis, 1939
 United States Post Office Nowata, Nowata, 1938
 Wagoner Armory, Wagoner, 1938
 Warren Theatre, Broken Arrow
 Washita County Jail, Cordell
 Washita Theatre, Chickasha, 1941
 Weatherford Armory, Weatherford, 1937
 Westland Theatre, Elk City, 1950

See also 
 List of Art Deco architecture
 List of Art Deco architecture in the United States

References 

 "Architectural Surveys." Oklahoma Historical Society. Retrieved 2022-09-06.
 "Art Deco & Streamline Moderne Buildings." Roadside Architecture.com. Retrieved 2019-01-03.
 "Art Deco Buildings in Tulsa". Tulsa Preservation Commission. 2015-05-06. Retrieved 2019-01-03.
 Cinema Treasures. Retrieved 2022-09-06
 "Court House Lover". Flickr. Retrieved 2022-09-06
 "New Deal Map". The Living New Deal. Retrieved 2020-12-25.
 "SAH Archipedia". Society of Architectural Historians. Retrieved 2021-11-21.

External links 
 

 
Art Deco
Art Deco architecture in Oklahoma
Oklahoma-related lists